The Éternité Lake is a body of water tributary of the Éternité River and the Saguenay River. It is located in the municipality of Rivière-Éternité, in the Le Fjord-du-Saguenay Regional County Municipality of the administrative region of Saguenay–Lac-Saint-Jean, in the province of Quebec, in Canada. The Éternité Lake straddles the townships of Brébeuf and Hébert. This lake is integrated into the zec du Lac-au-Sable, a controlled exploitation zone.

The northern part of Éternité Lake is served by route 170, that is the main street (east–west direction) which runs south of Otis Lake going west. Few other secondary forest roads serve the lake sector for forestry and recreational tourism activities.

Forestry is the main economic activity in the sector; recreational tourism, second.

The surface of Lake Eternity is usually frozen from the end of November to the beginning of April, however the safe circulation on the ice is generally from mid-December to the end of March.

Geography 
The main watersheds adjacent to Eternity Lake are:
 north side: Lac de la Tour, Otis Lake, Lac à la Croix, Saguenay River;
 east side: Saint-Jean River, Éternité River, Saguenay River, Périgny Lake, "Lac à la Truite";
 south side: Saint-Jean River, rivière à la Catin, "Lac des Hauteurs", Malbaie River;
 west side: Bailloquet Lake, Brébeuf lake, Pierre River, Bras de Ross, Ha! Ha! River.

The Éternité River has its source at Eternity lake. The northeast part of the lake has the shape of a giraffe neck and head looking towards the southeast; the South-West part has the shape of a cross whose top is oriented towards the South-East. The two parts of the lake are connected opposite the outlet of Lake Bailloquet. This lake is surrounded by mountains.

The mouth of Éternité Lake is located at:
  south-west of the village center of Rivière-Éternité;
  north-east of Brébeuf Lake;
  south-east of a bay on the Saguenay River;
  south-west of the confluence of the Éternité River (Baie Éternité) and the Saguenay River;
  north-east of the mouth of Lake Ha! Ha!;
  east of downtown Saguenay (city);
  west of downtown Tadoussac.

Toponymy 
The explorer Joseph Bureau, in his 1904 report on the township of Hébert, designated this body of water "le grand lac Éternité".

The toponym "Lac Éternité" was formalized on December 5, 1968, by the Commission de toponymie du Québec.

See also 

 Le Fjord-du-Saguenay Regional County Municipality
 Zec du Lac-au-Sable, a controlled exploitation zone (zec)
 Rivière-Éternité, a municipality
 Éternité River
 Saguenay River

References 

Lakes of Saguenay–Lac-Saint-Jean
Le Fjord-du-Saguenay Regional County Municipality